Tião Macalé may refer to:

 Tião Macalé (comedian) (1926-1993), Brazilian comedian
 Tião Macalé (footballer) (1936-1972), Brazilian footballer